The Missing Link is a 1927 American silent comedy film directed by Charles Reisner and starring Syd Chaplin, Ruth Hiatt and Tom McGuire. The title is a reference to the so-called "missing link" that connects man and the ape.

Reception
The film was a major production by Warner Brothers, with a budget of $313,000. It earned $608,000, more than any other silent film released by the studio  that season.

The New York Times critic Mordaunt Hall praised the film, observing "there are sequences in this comic contraption that are almost ceirtain to appeal to anybody".

Main cast
 Syd Chaplin as Arthur Wells  
 Ruth Hiatt as Beatrice Braden  
 Tom McGuire as Colonel Braden  
 Crauford Kent as Lord Melville Dryden  
 Nick Cogley as Captain  
 Sam Baker as The Missing Link  
 Otto Fries 
 Kewpie Morgan as Baggage Master

Box Office
According to Warner Bros records the film earned $425,000 domestically and $163,000 foreign.

References

Bibliography

External links

1927 films
1927 comedy films
Silent American comedy films
Films directed by Charles Reisner
American silent feature films
1920s English-language films
Warner Bros. films
American black-and-white films
1920s American films